Irving is an originally Scottish surname, a variant of the name Irvine, which is derived from the eponymous River Irvine in Dumfriesshire. Irving is also used as a male given name.

Notable people with the name include:

Surname

 Amy Irving (born 1953), American film and stage actress
 Arthur Irving (born 1931), Canadian industrialist, son of K.C. Irving
 Bob Irving (sportscaster), Canadian sportscaster
 Bud Irving (born 1926), Canadian football player
 Charles Irving (surgeon) (?-1794?), Scottish naval surgeon, inventor and colonial entrepreneur
 Clifford Irving (1930–2017), American author who created a hoax autobiography of Howard Hughes
 Dan Irving (1854–1924), British politician, Labour MP
 David Irving (born 1938), British writer, best known for his denial of the Holocaust
 David Irving (footballer) (born 1951), British footballer
 Edmund George Irving (1910–1990), British naval hydrographer
 Edward Irving (1792–1834), Scottish clergyman
 Edward Irving (plant collector) (1816–1855), Scottish surgeon
 Edward A. Irving (1927–2014), Canadian geologist
 Francis Irving, British programmer and activist for freedom of information
 George S. Irving, (1922–2016), American actor
 Godfrey Irving (1867–1937), senior Australian Army officer
 Henry Irving (1838–1905), British actor
 Isabel Irving (1871–1944), American actress
 James K. Irving (born 1928), Canadian industrialist, son of K.C. Irving
 Jayne Irving (born 1956), British TV presenter 
 John Irving (disambiguation), several people
 Jules Irving (1925–1979), American actor, director, educator, and producer, 
 K. C. Irving (Kenneth Colin Irving, 1899–1992), Canadian industrialist, founder of the Irving Group of Companies
 Kyrie Irving (born 1992), American professional basketball player
 Levin Thomas Handy Irving (1828–1892), justice of the Maryland Court of Appeals
 Martin Howy Irving (1831–1912), English rower and educationist in Australia; father of Godfrey Irving
 Mary Jane Irving (1913–1983), American actress
 Robert Irving (disambiguation), several people
 Thomas Ballantyne Irving (1914–2002), publisher of the first American English translation of the Qur'an
 Thomas Irving (Medal of Honor) (born 1842)
 Washington Irving (1783–1859), American author, historian and diplomat
 William Irving (disambiguation), several people

Given name
Irving Abella (1940-2022), Canadian writer
Irving Amen (1918–2011), printmaker
Irving Azoff (born 1947), American music executive and manager
Irving Berlin (1888–1989), Russian-born American songwriter
Irving Block, American matte painter and screenwriter, wrote the story on which Forbidden Planet was based.
Irving Caesar (1895–1996), American lyricist
Irving D. Chais (1925–2009), American businessman
Irving Chernev (1900–1981), Russian-American chess player and author
Irving Copi (1917–2002), American philosopher
Irving Cottler (1918–1989), American drummer
Irving Crane (1913–2001), American pool player
Irving Dardik, American surgeon
Irving Davidson (born 1929), Australian rules footballer
Irving Davis (1896–1958), American footballer
Irving Fein (1911–2012), American television and film producer
Irving Feinstein (1910–1939), American mobster
Irving Feldman (born 1928), American poet
Irving Fields (1915–2016), American pianist
Irving Fine (1914–1962), American composer
Irving Finkel, British philologist and Assyriologist, curator in the Middle East department of the British Museum
Irving Fisher (1867–1947), American economist
Irving Folwartshny (1914–1994), American athlete
Irving Freese (1903–1964), Mayor of Norwalk, Connecticut
Irving Garcia (soccer, born 1988) (born 1988), American footballer
Irving Garcia (boxer) (born 1979), Puerto Rican boxer
Irving C. Gardner,
Irving Gill (1870–1936), American architect
Irving Goff (1900–1989), 
Irving Goldman (1911–2012), American anthropologist
Irving B. Goldman (1898–1975), American otolaryngologist
Irving Gottesman (1930–2016), American psychologist
Irving Gould (1919–2004), Canadian businessman
Irving Harper,
Irving Howe (1920–1993), Jewish-American literary critic
Irving Janis (1918–1990), American psychologist
Irving Johnson (1905–1991), American adventurer and author
Irving Kane Pond (1857–1939), American architect
Irving Kaplan (government official)
Irving Kaplan (chemist) (1913–1997), American chemist
Irving Kaplan (radiation oncologist), American radiation oncologist
Irving Kaplansky (1917–2006), mathematician
Irving Kaplan (chemist), an MIT professor
Irving Langmuir (1881–1957), chemist and physicist and winner of the 1932 Nobel Prize for Chemistry
Irving Lavin (born 1927), American art historian
Irving R. Levine (1922–2009), broadcast journalist
Irving Layton (1912–2006), Canadian poet
Irving Lehman (1876–1945), American lawyer and Jewish politician
Irving Lerner (1909–1976), American filmmaker
Irving Lowens (1916–1983), American musicologist and critic
Irving Malin (1934–2014), American literary critic
Irving Martin
Irving Mansfield (1908–1988), American producer and writer
Irving Mills (1894–1985), American music publisher
Irving Millman (1923–2012), American virologist and microbiologist
Irving Mondschein (1924–2015), track and field champion
Irving Morrow (1884–1952), American architect
Irving Moskowitz (1928–2016), American physician, businessman, and philanthropist
Irving Mosberg (1908–1973), New York politician and judge
Irving Nattrass (born 1952), English footballer
Irving Penn (1917–2009), American photographer
Irving S. Reed (1923–2012), American mathematician and engineer
Irving Reiner (1924–1986), American mathematician
Irving "Ving" Rhames, African-American actor
Irv Rubin (Irving David Rubin) (1945–2002), former Jewish Defense League leader
Irving Sablosky (1924–2016), American diplomat
Irving Saladino (born 1983), Panamanian long jumper
Irving Sandler (1925–2018), American art critic and art historian
Irving Saraf (1932–2012), Polis-born American film producer
Irving Sayles (1872–1914), African-American vaudeville entertainer
Irving H. Saypol (1905–1977), American attorney
Irving Schwartz (1929–2010), Canadian businessman
Irving Selikoff (1915–1992), American physician
Irving Slosberg (born 1947), American politician
Irving Stern (1928-2023), American politician
Irving Stone (1903–1989), American writer
Irving Stowe (1915–1974), American lawyer
Irving Taylor (songwriter) (b. 1983), American songwriter
Irving Taylor (ice hockey) (1919–1991), Canadian ice hockey player
Irving Thalberg (1899–1936), American film producer
Irving Thalberg, Jr. (1930–1987), American philosopher
Irving C. Tomlinson (1860–1944), American Universalist minister
Irving Townsend (1920–1981), American record producer and author
Irving Vendig, (1902–1995), American soap opera writer
Irving Wallace, American novelist and non-fiction writer
Irving B. Weiner, American psychologist
Irving Zola (1935–1994), American activist and writer
Irving Zurita (born 1991), Mexican footballer

See also
 Earvin
 Ervin (disambiguation)
 Ervine
 Erving (disambiguation)
 Erwan
 Erwin (disambiguation)
 Irvin
 Irvine (disambiguation)
 Irwin (disambiguation)

Scottish masculine given names
Scottish surnames
English-language surnames